Novobaygildino (Yañı Baygilde; , U Pajgelde) is a rural locality (a village) in Michurinsky Selsoviet, Sharansky District, Bashkortostan, Russia. The population was 55 as of 2010. There is 1 street.

Geography 
Novobaygildino is located 26 km northeast of Sharan (the district's administrative centre) by road. Novobaykiyevo is the nearest rural locality.

References 

Rural localities in Sharansky District